Rafael Ripoz, O.P. (1553–1620) was a Roman Catholic prelate who served as Bishop of Perpignan-Elne (1618–1620).

Biography
Rafael Ripoz was born in Barcelona, Spain, in 1553 and ordained a priest in the Order of Preachers. He was appointed Bishop of Perpignan-Elne on 12 November 1618,  during the papacy of Pope Paul V. On 25 November 1618, he was consecrated bishop by Giovanni Garzia Mellini, Cardinal-Priest of Santi Quattro Coronati, with Diego Alvarez (archbishop), Archbishop of Trani, and Alessandro Guidiccioni (iuniore), Bishop of Lucca, serving as co-consecrators. 
He served as Bishop of Perpignan-Elne until his death on 17 December 1620.

References 

17th-century French Roman Catholic bishops
Bishops appointed by Pope Paul V
1553 births
1620 deaths